The 2017–18 UEFA Europa League qualifying phase and play-off round began on 29 June and ended on 24 August 2017. A total of 156 teams competed in the qualifying phase and play-off round to decide 22 of the 48 places in the group stage of the 2017–18 UEFA Europa League.

All times were CEST (UTC+2).

Round and draw dates
The schedule of the qualifying phase and play-off round was as follows (all draws were held at the UEFA headquarters in Nyon, Switzerland).

Matches may also be played on Tuesdays or Wednesdays instead of the regular Thursdays due to scheduling conflicts.

Format
In the qualifying phase and play-off round, each tie was played over two legs, with each team playing one leg at home. The team that scored more goals on aggregate over the two legs advanced to the next round. If the aggregate score was level, the away goals rule was applied, i.e. the team that scored more goals away from home over the two legs advanced. If away goals were also equal, then 30 minutes of extra time was played. The away goals rule was again applied after extra time, i.e. if there were goals scored during extra time and the aggregate score was still level, the visiting team advanced by virtue of more away goals scored. If no goals were scored during extra time, the tie was decided by penalty shoot-out.

In the draws for each round, teams were seeded based on their UEFA club coefficients at the beginning of the season, with the teams divided into seeded and unseeded pots. A seeded team was drawn against an unseeded team, with the order of legs in each tie decided by draw. Due to the limited time between matches, the draws for the second and third qualifying rounds took place before the results of the previous round were known. For these draws (or in any cases where the result of a tie in the previous round was not known at the time of the draw), the seeding was carried out under the assumption that the team with the higher coefficient of an undecided tie advanced to this round, which means if the team with the lower coefficient was to advance, it simply took the seeding of its defeated opponent. Prior to the draws, UEFA may form "groups" in accordance with the principles set by the Club Competitions Committee, but they were purely for convenience of the draw and for ensuring that teams from the same association (or associations with political conflicts) were not drawn against each other, and did not resemble any real groupings in the sense of the competition.

Teams
A total of 156 teams were involved in the qualifying phase and play-off round, including the 15 losers of the third qualifying round (10 in Champions Route, 5 in League Route) which entered the play-off round. The 22 winners of the play-off round advanced to the group stage to join the 16 teams which entered in the group stage and the 10 losers of the Champions League play-off round (5 in Champions Route, 5 in League Route).

Below were the participating teams (with their 2017 UEFA club coefficients), grouped by their starting rounds.

Notes

First qualifying round

The draw for the first qualifying round was held on 19 June 2017, 13:00 CEST.

Seeding
A total of 100 teams played in the first qualifying round. Prior to the draw the participating teams were placed in ten groups with five seeded and five unseeded teams, depending on their UEFA club coefficient. (Note: The numbers for each team were pre-assigned by UEFA so that the draw could be held in one run for all groups.)

Summary

The first legs were played on 29 June, and the second legs were played on 4 and 6 July 2017.

|}

Notes

Matches

Maccabi Tel Aviv won 5–0 on aggregate.

Inter Baku won 5–0 on aggregate.

Gorica won 4–2 on aggregate.

Shkëndija won 7–0 on aggregate.

Trenčín won 8–1 on aggregate.

Kairat won 8–1 on aggregate.

Rheindorf Altach won 2–1 on aggregate.

Zira won 4–1 on aggregate.

Levski Sofia won 3–1 on aggregate.

Lech Poznań won 7–0 on aggregate.

Beitar Jerusalem won 7–3 on aggregate.

Fola Esch won 3–2 on aggregate.

Ružomberok won 3–2 on aggregate.

Irtysh Pavlodar won 3–0 on aggregate.

Mladost Podgorica won 4–0 on aggregate.

Široki Brijeg won 2–0 on aggregate.

Botev Plovdiv won 4–1 on aggregate.

Slovan Bratislava won 9–1 on aggregate.

Jagiellonia Białystok won 5–0 on aggregate.

Videoton won 5–3 on aggregate.

Red Star Belgrade won 6–3 on aggregate.

Osijek won 6–0 on aggregate.

Rabotnički won 7–0 on aggregate.

Željezničar Sarajevo won 3–2 on aggregate.

AEL Limassol won 10–0 on aggregate.

Valletta won 3–0 on aggregate.

3–3 on aggregate. Zaria Bălți won 6–5 on penalties.

Progrès Niederkorn won 2–1 on aggregate.

AEK Larnaca won 6–1 on aggregate.

Skënderbeu won 6–0 on aggregate.

Valur won 1–0 on aggregate.

Vaduz won 5–1 on aggregate.

Domžale won 5–2 on aggregate.

Midtjylland won 10–2 on aggregate.

Haugesund won 7–0 on aggregate.

Trakai won 3–1 on aggregate.

VPS won 2–0 on aggregate.

3–3 on aggregate. Liepāja won on away goals

Dinamo Minsk won 4–1 on aggregate.

Shamrock Rovers won 2–0 on aggregate.

Odd won 5–0 on aggregate.

HJK won 3–1 on aggregate.

Nõmme Kalju won 4–2 on aggregate.

Ferencváros won 3–0 on aggregate.

IFK Norrköping won 6–0 on aggregate.

Sūduva Marijampolė won 2–1 on aggregate.

KR won 2–0 on aggregate.

Cork City won 6–2 on aggregate.

Lyngby won 4–0 on aggregate.

AIK won 5–0 on aggregate.

Second qualifying round

The draw for the second qualifying round was held on 19 June 2017, 14:30 CEST (after the completion of the first qualifying round draw).

Seeding
A total of 66 teams played in the second qualifying round: 16 teams which entered in this round, and the 50 winners of the first qualifying round. Prior to the draw the participating teams were placed in six groups with five seeded and five unseeded teams (groups 1–3) or six seeded and six unseeded teams (groups 4–6), depending on their UEFA club coefficient. (Note: The numbers for each team were pre-assigned by UEFA so that the draw could be held in one run for the groups with ten teams and another run for the groups with twelve teams.) Since the draw for the second qualifying round took place before the results of the previous round were known, the seeding was carried out under the assumption that the team with the higher coefficient of an undecided tie would advance to this round, which meant if the team with the lower coefficient was to advance, it simply took the seeding of its defeated opponent.

Notes

Summary

The first legs were played on 12 and 13 July, and the second legs were played on 20 July 2017.

|}

Notes

Matches

Botev Plovdiv won 5–1 on aggregate.

Apollon Limassol won 5–1 on aggregate.

Dinamo Minsk won 4–1 on aggregate.

Lyngby won 3–1 on aggregate.

Mladá Boleslav won 5–2 on aggregate.

AIK won 2–0 on aggregate.

AEK Larnaca won 2–0 on aggregate.

Skënderbeu won 3–1 on aggregate.

Panionios won 5–2 on aggregate.

Astra Giurgiu won 3–1 on aggregate.

Lech Poznań won 4–3 on aggregate.

Brøndby won 3–2 on aggregate.

3–3 on aggregate. Trakai won 5–3 on penalties.

Hajduk Split won 3–1 on aggregate.

Videoton won 4–1 on aggregate.

Maccabi Tel Aviv won 5–1 on aggregate.

Utrecht won 3–1 on aggregate.

Ružomberok won 2–1 on aggregate.

Sūduva Marijampolė won 2–1 on aggregate.

Gabala won 3–1 on aggregate.

AEL Limassol won 3–1 on aggregate.

Rheindorf Altach won 4–1 on aggregate.

Östersund won 3–1 on aggregate.

Fola Esch won 4–2 on aggregate.

Odd won 2–0 on aggregate.

Domžale won 5–3 on aggregate.

Red Star Belgrade won 3–1 on aggregate.

Aberdeen won 3–1 on aggregate.

Midtjylland won 7–3 on aggregate.

Sturm Graz won 3–1 on aggregate.

Shkëndija won 4–2 on aggregate.

Bnei Yehuda won 3–1 on aggregate.

Osijek won 3–2 on aggregate.

Third qualifying round

The draw for the third qualifying round was held on 14 July 2017, 13:00 CEST.

Seeding
A total of 58 teams played in the third qualifying round: 25 teams which entered in this round, and the 33 winners of the second qualifying round. Prior to the draw the participating teams were placed in one group with five seeded and five unseeded teams (group 1) and four groups with six seeded and six unseeded teams (groups 2–5), depending on their UEFA club coefficient. (Note: The numbers for each team were pre-assigned by UEFA so that the draw could be held in one run for the group with ten teams and another run for the groups with twelve teams.) Since the draw for the third qualifying round took place before the results of the previous round were known, the seeding was carried out under the assumption that the team with the higher coefficient of an undecided tie would advance to this round, which meant if the team with the lower coefficient was to advance, it simply took the seeding of its defeated opponent.

Notes

Summary

The first legs were played on 27 July, and the second legs were played on 2 and 3 August 2017.

|}

Notes

Matches

Osijek won 2–0 on aggregate.

Shkëndija won 4–2 on aggregate.

Krasnodar won 5–2 on aggregate.

Fenerbahçe won 3–2 on aggregate.

Panathinaikos won 3–1 on aggregate.

3–3 on aggregate. Skënderbeu won 4–2 on penalties.

Austria Wien won 2–1 on aggregate.

Dinamo Zagreb won 2–1 on aggregate.

Athletic Bilbao won 4–1 on aggregate.

PAOK won 3–1 on aggregate.

4–4 on aggregate. Midtjylland won on away goals.

Östersund won 3–1 on aggregate.

2–2 on aggregate. Videoton won on away goals.

Maccabi Tel Aviv won 2–0 on aggregate.

2–2 on aggregate. Utrecht won on away goals.

Milan won 3–0 on aggregate.

Hajduk Split won 2–0 on aggregate.

Rheindorf Altach won 4–2 on aggregate.

Oleksandriya won 1–0 on aggregate.

Everton won 2–0 on aggregate.

Apollon Limassol won 3–2 on aggregate.

Red Star Belgrade won 3–0 on aggregate.

Marítimo won 2–0 on aggregate.

Zenit Saint Petersburg won 2–1 on aggregate.

Marseille won 4–2 on aggregate.

Domžale won 2–1 on aggregate.

AEK Larnaca won 3–1 on aggregate.

Braga won 3–2 on aggregate.

Sūduva Marijampolė won 4–1 on aggregate.

Play-off round

The draw for the play-off round was held on 4 August 2017, 13:00 CEST.

Seeding
A total of 44 teams played in the play-off round: the 29 winners of the third qualifying round, and the 15 losers of the 2017–18 UEFA Champions League third qualifying round. Prior to the draw the participating teams were placed in two groups with five seeded and five unseeded teams (groups 1–2) and two groups with six seeded and six unseeded teams (groups 3–4), depending on their UEFA club coefficient. (Note: The numbers for each team were pre-assigned by UEFA so that the draw could be held in one run for the groups with ten teams and another run for the groups with twelve teams.)

Notes

Summary

The first legs were played on 16 and 17 August, and the second legs were played on 24 August 2017.

|}

Notes

Matches

Milan won 7–0 on aggregate.

2–2 on aggregate. Austria Wien won on away goals.4–4 on aggregate. Red Star Belgrade won on away goals.AEK Athens won 3–0 on aggregate.Dynamo Kyiv won 3–1 on aggregate.Athletic Bilbao won 4–2 on aggregate.Apollon Limassol won 4–3 on aggregate.Braga won 5–3 on aggregate.Everton won 3–1 on aggregate.Red Bull Salzburg won 7–1 on aggregate.Vardar won 4–1 on aggregate.Rosenborg won 4–2 on aggregate.Maccabi Tel Aviv won 3–2 on aggregate.BATE Borisov won 3–2 on aggregate.1–1 on aggregate. Skënderbeu won on away goals.Ludogorets Razgrad won 2–0 on aggregate.Marseille won 4–1 on aggregate.Partizan won 4–0 on aggregate.Zenit Saint Petersburg won 2–1 on aggregate.1–1 on aggregate. Sheriff Tiraspol won on away goals.Viktoria Plzeň won 3–1 on aggregate.3–3 on aggregate. Östersund won on away goals.''

Top goalscorers
There were 662 goals scored in 268 matches in the qualifying phase and play-off round, for an average of  goals per match.

Source:

Notes

References

External links
UEFA Europa League (official website)
UEFA Europa League history: 2017/18

1
June 2017 sports events in Europe
July 2017 sports events in Europe
August 2017 sports events in Europe
UEFA Europa League qualifying rounds